Bardial (also Romanized as Bardīāl and Bardyāl) is a village in Marz Rural District, Chah Dadkhoda District, Qaleh Ganj County, Kerman Province, Iran. At the 2006 census, its population was 161, in thirty families.

References 

Populated places in Qaleh Ganj County